The Festival international Albert-Roussel, created in 1997 by the tenor Damien Top to combat cultural desertification in rural areas, takes place every year in the region Nord-Pas-de-Calais and in Belgium in September-October. The programming is mainly focused on 20th century French music and contemporary creation.

External links 
 Official website
 Festival international Albert Roussel (Les amis de la musique)
 Le festival international Albert-Roussel accueille le quatuor à cordes de l’Armée de Terre (La Voix du Nord)
 Festival Albert Roussel (Piano bleu)
 The Festival (Classic news.com)
 2006 edition of the Festival
 Bailleul - Une confrontation surprenante entre poésie et percussions au festival Albert-Roussel (La Voix du Nord)
 Entretien avec Damien Top, directeur du festival international Albert Roussel
 2017 edition of the Festival Albert Roussel

Albert-Roussel
Albert-Roussel
1997 establishments in France